Michael Ross "Roscoe" Rutledge (July 7, 1962 – April 23, 2004) is a former field hockey player.

Rutledge participated in two consecutive Summer Olympics for Canada, starting in 1984. After having finished in tenth position in Los Angeles, California, the longtime resident of Langley, British Columbia ended up in eleventh place with the Men's National Team in the Seoul Games.

He died from cancer. In Ambleside, West Vancouver, there is a field hockey turf called Rutledge Field, the home ground of the West Vancouver Field Hockey Club. The field was dedicated in memorial of Ross Rutledge in 2011 who was a local advocate for field hockey, having started the West Vancouver Field Hockey Club Adanacs player development program.

International senior competitions

 1984 – Olympic Games, Los Angeles (10th)
 1988 – Olympic Games, Seoul (11th)
 1990 – World Cup, Lahore (11th)

References
 Canadian Olympic Committee
 
 Ambleside “A” Artificial Turf Sport Field Officially Named “Rutledge Field”
 "Hockey's home at last", North Shore News, 4 Sept 2011

External links
 

1962 births
2004 deaths
Canadian male field hockey players
Olympic field hockey players of Canada
Field hockey players at the 1984 Summer Olympics
Field hockey players at the 1988 Summer Olympics
Pan American Games gold medalists for Canada
Pan American Games silver medalists for Canada
Field hockey players at the 1983 Pan American Games
Field hockey players at the 1987 Pan American Games
Field hockey players at the 1991 Pan American Games
Canadian expatriate sportspeople in Australia
Canadian people of British descent
Deaths from cancer in British Columbia
Field hockey players from Vancouver
Pan American Games medalists in field hockey
1990 Men's Hockey World Cup players
Medalists at the 1983 Pan American Games
Medalists at the 1987 Pan American Games
Medalists at the 1991 Pan American Games